Elections to Purbeck District Council were held on 1 May 2003. One third of the council was up for election and the Conservative Party stayed in overall control of the council.

After the election, the composition of the council was
Conservative 13
Liberal Democrat 8
Independent 3

Election result

Ward results

References
2003 Purbeck election result
Ward results

2003
2003 English local elections
2000s in Dorset